The president of Senegal is the head of state and head of government of Senegal. In accordance with the constitutional reform of 2001 and since a referendum that took place on 20 March 2016, the president is elected for a 5-year term, with a limit of two consecutive terms. The following is a list of presidents of Senegal, since the country gained independence from France in 1960.

Presidents of Senegal (1960–present)

Key 
Political parties

Symbols
 Elected unopposed

Officeholders

Timeline

Latest election

See also
Senegal 
Prime Minister of Senegal
First Lady of Senegal
List of colonial governors of Senegal
Politics of Senegal 
Lists of office-holders

References

External links
World Statesmen – Senegal

 
Government of Senegal
Presidents
1960 establishments in Senegal